Viburnum cinnamomifolium, the cinnamon-leaved viburnum, is a species of flowering plant in the family Adoxaceae, native to western China. Round clusters of tiny white flowers are produced in late spring, followed in late summer and autumn by oval black fruits. 

The Latin specific epithet cinnamomifolium means "with leaves like cinnamon", and refers to the heavily veined leaves of certain species of cinnamon plant. 

This plant has gained the Royal Horticultural Society's Award of Garden Merit.

References

cinnamomifolium
Flora of China